The Irish Council for Bioethics was an independent body established by the Government of Ireland in 2002 to examine and respond to bioethical issues in science and medicine. It provided independent advice to the government and those making policy, as well as promoting public understanding of contemporary bioethical issues. It ceased operations in 2010, due to withdrawal of state funding in the wake of the post-2008 Irish economic downturn.

During its years of operation, the members of the council were nominated by the Royal Irish Academy, which also provided the body's secretariat. It was funded by grants through Forfás.

References

External links
 Archived version of official website

Bioethics
Bioethics research organizations
Ethics of science and technology
Medical and health organisations based in the Republic of Ireland
Organisations based in Dublin (city)
Organizations established in 2002